Hernán Emanuel Urra (born 31 October 1996) is an Argentine Paralympic athlete with cerebral palsy competing in F35-classification shot put events. He represented Argentina at the 2016 Summer Paralympics held in Rio de Janeiro, Brazil and he won the silver medal in the men's shot put F35 event. He also won the silver medal in the men's shot put F35 event at the 2020 Summer Paralympics held in Tokyo, Japan.

In 2019, he qualified to represent Argentina at the 2020 Summer Paralympics in Tokyo, Japan after winning the bronze medal in the men's shot put F35 event at the 2019 World Para Athletics Championships held in Dubai, United Arab Emirates.

Achievements

References

External links 
 

Living people
1996 births
People from Río Negro Province
Track and field athletes with cerebral palsy
Argentine male shot putters
Athletes (track and field) at the 2016 Summer Paralympics
Athletes (track and field) at the 2020 Summer Paralympics
Medalists at the 2016 Summer Paralympics
Medalists at the 2020 Summer Paralympics
Paralympic silver medalists for Argentina
Paralympic medalists in athletics (track and field)
Paralympic athletes of Argentina
Medalists at the World Para Athletics Championships
Medalists at the 2019 Parapan American Games